Jennifer Jean York (born August 30, 1962) is a studio traffic reporter with KNX news radio in Los Angeles.

Education
York graduated from UCLA with a bachelor's degree in Political Science and Communications.

Early career
York worked as a talent coordinator for Pierre Cossette Productions, contributing to events such as the Grammy Awards and the American Music Awards. After graduating from UCLA in 1984, York started working at Good Morning America, where she was eventually hired and promoted to the Field and Series unit.

Return to LA
In 1987 York returned to Los Angeles and quickly became an aerial reporter for KFWB, becoming the second ever female traffic reporter to fly in a helicopter (the first being Kelly Lange, who flew for KABC Radio). In 1991 she joined KTLA Morning News as their aerial traffic reporter while becoming a household name in Southern California.

York has won numerous awards for her performance, earning an Emmy Award in 1993 for her coverage of the Malibu fires as well as two more the next year for the Northridge earthquake and her morning news reports. She has also received three Golden Mike Awards in 1998, 1999, and 2003 and another Emmy in 2003. York has been featured on shows such as Larry King Live, Entertainment Tonight, and The Leeza Show while having appeared in films such as That Thing You Do!, Bandits, and Hollywood Homicide.

Other work
York is also an electric and acoustic bassist, and performed with the all-female Christian rock group Rachel Rachel (of which she was the founder).  The group, now defunct, recorded two albums and performed at several events such as the Long Beach Jazz Festival, the Pasadena Playboy Jazz Festival, and the Montreal Drum Festival.

During the Mercyhurst College Talent Show scene of Tom Hanks' 1996 movie That Thing You Do!, York can be seen as the acoustic bass player for the girl group that is performing in the contest.

References

1962 births
University of California, Los Angeles alumni
People from Hemet, California
Living people
American women guitarists
American performers of Christian music
American rock bass guitarists
Women bass guitarists
Journalists from California
Guitarists from California
American women television journalists
American pop rock musicians
21st-century American women